Crime & Investigation (stylized as Crime + Investigation, and formerly known as Mystery) is a Canadian English language discretionary specialty channel owned by Corus Entertainment.

It is a licensed version of A&E Networks' U.S. channel of the same name, and airs true crime programming from the libraries of A&E, and off-network reruns of police procedural and crime dramas from the libraries of Global and Showcase.

History
The channel was licensed as 13th Street by the Canadian Radio-television and Telecommunications Commission (CRTC) on November 24, 2000, to Canwest (45.05%), Groupe TVA (45.05%) and Rogers Communications (9.9%). Before the channel's launch, both Canwest and Groupe TVA acquired Rogers' shares in the service equally. The channel was described as "a national English-language Category 1 specialty television service devoted to mystery and suspense programming. The service will nurture and encourage short form Canadian mysteries. It will provide a wide assortment of genre-specific programs including movies, television series, short films and documentaries that will focus exclusively on the delivery of entertaining programming on suspense, espionage and classic mysteries."

The channel was launched as Mystery on September 7, 2001. TVA, Canwest and Rogers also owned the same shares of its French counterpart, Mystère, which would become wholly owned by TVA before launch. The channel was rebranded as Mystery TV in 2007, though the channel was still referred to as "Mystery" on-air.

On October 27, 2010, Shaw Communications completed its acquisition of Canwest, giving it control of Canwest's 50% interest in Mystery TV. On December 22, 2011, Groupe TVA announced its intentions to sell its share of Mystery TV and The Cave to Shaw Communications, giving Shaw full control of these two channels. The deal was approved by the CRTC on April 25, 2012.

In June 2014, Shaw Media announced that Mystery TV, along with sister network Twist TV, would be rebranded as Canadian versions of Crime & Investigation and FYI, respectively, under a licensing agreement with A&E Networks. They were the fourth and fifth networks to be rebranded after History Television, Showcase Diva and The Cave were rebranded as Canadian versions of History, Lifetime and H2 respectively in 2012. It launched on November 3, 2014.

Noted series
 60 Days In
 Beauty and the Beast
 The Blacklist Bull Court Cam Due South Evil Hawaii Five-0 (2010) Live Rescue: Emergency Response MacGyver (2016) NCIS NCIS: Los Angeles NCIS: New Orleans Nightwatch Nation The Outer Limits SEAL Team Zoe Busiek: Wild Card Note'': series list is current as of April 2022.

References

External links
 

A&E Networks
Television channels and stations established in 2001
2001 establishments in Canada
Corus Entertainment networks
Digital cable television networks in Canada
English-language television stations in Canada